Final tables of the Lithuanian Championship in 2004 are presented below. The Lithuanian Football Federation (LFF) organized three football leagues: A Lyga (the highest), 1 Lyga (second-tier), and 2 Lyga (third-tier), which comprised four regional zones.

A Lyga

1 Lyga

2 Lyga

2 Lyga zone East

2 Lyga zone South

2 Lyga zone West

2 Lyga zone North

References
 

LFF Lyga seasons
1
Lith
Lith